For Heaven's Sake may refer to:

 For Heaven's Sake (1926 film), a comedy starring Harold Lloyd
 For Heaven's Sake (1950 film), a fantasy starring Clifton Webb
 For Heaven's Sake (2008 film), a film starring Florence Henderson
 For Heaven's Sake (comic strip), a religion-themed strip by Mike Morgan
 For Heaven's Sake (play), a 2012 play by Laura Pedersen
 "For Heaven's Sake", a song by Donald Meyer, Elise Bretton and Sherman Edwards
 "For Heaven's Sake", a song by 16 Horsepower from Low Estate
 "For Heaven's Sake", a song by Frankie Goes to Hollywood from Liverpool
 "For Heaven's Sake", a song by Wu-Tang Clan from Wu-Tang Forever